Andrés Gimeno defeated Patrick Proisy in the final, 4–6, 6–3, 6–1, 6–1 to win the men's singles tennis title at the 1972 French Open. This was his first and only major title and, at the age of 34, he became the oldest first-time major champion in the Open Era.

Jan Kodeš was the two-time defending champion, but lost in the quarterfinals to Proisy.

The French Lawn Tennis Federation halved the size of the draw from 128 to 64 players in an attempt to attract the top players on tour to the tournament; this change was reverted the following year as results were mixed.

Seeds
The seeded players are listed below. Andrés Gimeno is the champion; others show the round in which they were eliminated.

  Jan Kodeš (quarterfinals)
  Ilie Năstase (first round)
  Stan Smith (quarterfinals)
  Manuel Orantes (semifinals)
  Bob Hewitt (first round)
  Andrés Gimeno (champion)
  Pierre Barthès (third round)
  Željko Franulović (first round)
  Patrick Proisy (final)
  Alex Metreveli (semifinals)
  Clark Graebner (third round)
  Jimmy Connors (second round)
  Jaime Fillol Sr. (second round)
  František Pala (third round)
 -
  Barry Phillips-Moore (third round)

Qualifying

Draw

Finals

Section 1

Section 2

Section 3

Section 4

Section 5

Section 6

Section 7

Section 8

References

External links
 Association of Tennis Professionals (ATP) – 1972 French Open Men's Singles draw
 1972 French Open – Men's draws and results at the International Tennis Federation

Men's Singles
French Open by year – Men's singles
1972 Grand Prix (tennis)